Antonio "Toni" Lechuga Mateos (born 15 February 1988) is a Spanish professional footballer who plays as a goalkeeper for Real Jaén.

Club career
Born in Jerez de la Frontera, Province of Cádiz, Toni started his career with hometown's Xerez CD, playing several seasons with the reserves, the first being 2006–07 in the Tercera División. In late 2008 he was called up to train with the first team, but again only appeared officially for the B side.

Toni served as third-choice – backing up Renan and Chema in the 2009–10 campaign and playing understudy to Chema and Francisco Lledó in 2010–11 – in the following years. On 6 April 2011 he renewed his contract with the Andalusians, extending his link to the club until 2014.

On 20 May 2012, Toni made his debut as a professional, appearing in a 3–2 Segunda División home win against Deportivo de La Coruña. He was promoted to backup the next season, starting the first seven matches as it ended in relegation.

Toni spent the 2013–14 campaign in the Cypriot First Division with Doxa Katokopias FC. He returned to his country subsequently, seeing out his career in the lower leagues and amateur football.

Club statistics

References

External links

1988 births
Living people
Spanish footballers
Footballers from Jerez de la Frontera
Association football goalkeepers
Segunda División players
Segunda División B players
Tercera División players
Tercera Federación players
Divisiones Regionales de Fútbol players
Xerez CD B players
Xerez CD footballers
CD Guadalajara (Spain) footballers
Burgos CF footballers
Arcos CF players
CD Paracuellos Antamira players
Internacional de Madrid players
Real Jaén footballers
Cypriot First Division players
Doxa Katokopias FC players
Spanish expatriate footballers
Expatriate footballers in Cyprus
Spanish expatriate sportspeople in Cyprus